Meanstreak is an American all-female thrash metal band from Westchester, New York, United States. Active from 1985 to 1994, the band released only one album, Roadkill, in 1988. According to Spirit of Metal, Meanstreak was one of the first all-female thrash metal bands in history.

The band was founded by guitarists Marlene Apuzzo and Rena Sands. Bettina France joined as singer, Lisa Pace played bass guitar, and Diane Keyser was on drums. Keyser left the band shortly after Roadkill was recorded, and was replaced by Yael, who later went on to join My Ruin. Marlene Apuzzo, Rena Sands and Lisa Pace all married present or former members of the band Dream Theater. Sands, Pace and Apuzzo respectively wed guitarist John Petrucci, bassist John Myung and former drummer Mike Portnoy.

References

External links
 Meanstreak Bio (Spirit of Metal)
 www.MeanstreakOfficial.com

All-female bands
American thrash metal musical groups
Heavy metal musical groups from New York (state)